Phenacovolva morrisoni is a species of sea snail, a marine gastropod mollusc in the family Ovulidae, the ovulids, cowry allies or false cowries.

Description
The length of the shell attains 19.7 mm.

Distribution
This marine species occurs in the South China Sea off the Spratly Islands.

References

 Lorenz, F. & Fehse, D., 2009 The living Ovulidae. A manual of the families of allied cowries: Ovulidae, Pediculariidae and Eocypraeidae, p. 651 pp

Ovulidae
Gastropods described in 2009